WYTH (1250 AM) is a Christian radio station broadcasting a traditional and urban contemporary gospel format. Licensed to Madison, Georgia, United States, the station is currently owned by Craig Baker and Debra Baker. WYTH is a sister station to WKVQ 1540 AM in Eatonton, Georgia, but does not simulcast.

References

External links

YTH